A rubber duck is a rubber or a plastic duck-shaped bath toy.

Rubber duck may also refer to:

 Rubber duck (military), a fake rifle used in basic military training
 Rubber duck (engineering vehicle) British slang for a wheeled excavator.
 Rubber Duck (album), a 1976 album by C. W. McCall
 A character in the 1976 novelty single "Convoy" by C. W. McCall, and in the film based on the song, and in a later song 
 AN/SLQ-49 Chaff Buoy Decoy System, commonly referred to as "Rubber Duck", used for anti-ship-missile defense
 "Rubber Duckie", a song by the Sesame Street character Ernie
 "Rubber Ducky", a song by Quincy Jones; one of the soundtracks of the movie Dollar$
 Rubber ducky antenna, a short, flexible radio antenna sealed in protective rubber or plastic
 An inflatable boat
 Rubberduck, a DC Comics character
 Rubber duck debugging, an informal term used in software engineering to refer to a method of debugging code.
 Rubber Duck (sculpture), a floating sculpture by Dutch artist Florentijn Hofman
 Rubber Duck Entertainment, founded in 2004 as a division of Contender Entertainment Group until 2007, when Contenter Entertainment Group was acquired by Entertainment One in 2007. Separated from Astley Baker Davies, closed in 2009, due to the launch of E1 Entertainment.

See also
 Duck (disambiguation)